Estadio Azteca is a multi-purpose stadium located in Mexico City. It is the official home of football clubs Club América and Cruz Azul, as well as the Mexico national team. With a capacity of 87,523, it is the largest stadium in Mexico and Latin America and the eighth largest association football stadium in the world. 

Regarded as one of the most famous and iconic football stadiums in the world, it is the first to have hosted two FIFA World Cup Finals; the 1970 World Cup Final, where Brazil defeated Italy 4–1, and the 1986 World Cup Final, where Argentina defeated West Germany 3–2. It also hosted the 1986 quarter-final match between Argentina and England in which Diego Maradona scored both the "Hand of God goal" and the "Goal of the Century". The Estadio Azteca is the only football stadium in the world to have both Pelé (1970) and Diego Maradona (1986) win the FIFA World Cup, both of whom are considered among the greatest football players of all time. The stadium also hosted the "Game of the Century", when Italy defeated West Germany 4–3 in extra time in one of the 1970 semifinal matches. The stadium was also the principal venue for the football tournament of the 1968 Summer Olympics and the 1971 Women's World Cup. The stadium is scheduled to host games during the 2026 FIFA World Cup, making it the only stadium to host three editions of the FIFA World Cup.

Additionally, the National Football League (NFL) features one game at Estadio Azteca per season as a part of its International Series.

History

The Estadio Azteca was envisioned as a major sports venue during the Presidency of Adolfo López Mateos, when Mexico was awarded the 1968 Summer Olympics, where the football final was held. The stadium was designed by architects Pedro Ramírez Vázquez and Rafael Mijares Alcérreca and broke ground in 1961. The inaugural match was between Club América and Torino F.C. on 29 May 1966, with a capacity for 107,494 spectators. The first goal was scored by Brazilian Arlindo Dos Santos and the second one by Brazilian José Alves; later, the Italians tied the game, which ended in 2–2 draw. Mexican president Gustavo Díaz Ordaz made the initial kick and FIFA president Sir Stanley Rous was the witness.

A modern illumination system was inaugurated on 5 June 1966, with the first night game played between Spanish side Valencia C.F. and Necaxa. The first goal of the match was scored by Honduran José Cardona for Valencia. Roberto Martínez, aka Caña Brava, became the first Mexican to score a goal in the stadium after scoring for Necaxa. The result was a 3–1 victory for Valencia.

In 1978 the stadium hosted the final of the Copa Interamericana between América and Boca Juniors of Argentina, and would host a final again in 1990 between América and Club Olimpia of Paraguay.

The Estadio Azteca is also the site in which Pelé and Diego Maradona (during the 1970 and 1986 FIFA World Cup) lifted the trophy for the last time (The Jules Rimet Trophy and the current FIFA World Cup Trophy, respectively).

Estadio Azteca has also been used for musical performances throughout its history. Michael Jackson (5 sold-out shows in 1993), Menudo (in 1983), U2 (in 2006 and 2011), Luis Miguel (in 2002), Paul McCartney (in 2012 and 2017), Elton John, Maná, Juan Gabriel, Gloria Estefan, Jaguares, Lenny Kravitz, *Nsync, Hanson, Ana Gabriel, and The Three Tenors all have become part of the stadium's main spectacle. The stadium has also been used for political events, including Mexican president Felipe Calderón's campaign closure in 2006, as well as religious events, such as Jehovah's Witnesses conventions, and the appearance of Pope John Paul II in 1999.

In April 2017, it was announced that starting July 2018, Cruz Azul would relocate to the Azteca on a temporary basis, due to the impending demolition of the Estadio Azul. According to club owner Guillermo Álvarez, they plan on building a new private stadium, which could take an estimated three-to-four years.

The stadium is scheduled to host games during the 2026 FIFA World Cup that will take place in the United States, Mexico and Canada. It will be the third time Azteca hosts World Cup games as the 1970 and 1986 games took place at the stadium. Additionally, it is currently vying for the inaugural game with SoFi Stadium in Los Angeles as another possible venue for the game.

2015–19 renovation plans

The stadium has undergone gradual improvements and renovations, including the replacing of seating within the stadium as well as the installation of electronic advertising boards. In May 2015, modern Panasonic LED panels were installed at the north and south ends of the stadium, replacing the phosphorous panels installed in 1998.

In February 2015, a vast renovation plan was unveiled with the intention that the completion of the project coincide with the stadium's 50th anniversary and with Club América's centenary in 2016, as well as the construction of a commercial hub outside the stadium to be completed some time in 2019. It was reported that Grupo Televisa, owners of the stadium, approved a joint-venture bid from private development firms IQ Real Estate and Alhel. The hub, named "Foro Azteca", would reportedly consist of a mall, office spaces, two hotels, new leisure spaces, and parking spaces for 2,500 cars. The renovations to the stadium were planned in two phases: the first saw the demolition of the restaurant and seating at the lower east stand and the construction of a new hospitality area with dining and banqueting spaces, and the second saw the construction of new media boxes and private skyboxes at the upper west stand. The renovations to the stadium were completed in November 2016. The seating capacity was ultimately reduced to 87,000 as a result of the renovations.

Name

The name "Azteca" is a tribute to the Aztec heritage of Mexico City. The stadium is currently owned by Mexican multimedia conglomerate Televisa, which has a heated media rivalry with the similarly named TV Azteca. Although there had been little to no confusion between the stadium and television network (which itself had only come into existence four years before in 1993), Televisa officially changed the stadium's name to Estadio Guillermo Cañedo on 20 January 1997, in tribute to Guillermo Cañedo de la Bárcena, a top network executive, former Mexican Football Federation president, and a prominent member of the FIFA executive committee who had died that day. As with the similar situation with the defunct Candlestick Park in San Francisco in the United States and its sponsored names, few outside of Televisa itself took up the new name, and most of the general public probably had no thought about the stadium's ownership (much less the Televisa/Azteca rivalry) and continued to refer to the Estadio Azteca by its original (and current) name. After two of Cañedo's sons took a business interest in TV Azteca in 1998, Televisa quietly returned to referring to it solely as Estadio Azteca.

Known colloquially by the nickname "Coloso de Santa Úrsula", which in English translates to "Colossus of Saint Ursula", due to its large structure and Santa Úrsula referring to the suburb where the stadium is located.

Access and entrance
It is served by the Azteca station on the Xochimilco Light Rail line. This line is an extension of the Mexico City metro system which begins at Metro Tasqueña station and ends in the Xochimilco Light Rail Station.

Tickets are available up until kick-off times from the ticket office which is located at the front of the stadium, located towards the exit ramps from the Azteca station. Prices start from as little as MXN$100 (about US$5 as of 2016), and could cost up to MXN$500 (about US$26 as of 2016) for more high-profile matches.

Monuments and memorials

A commemorative bronze plaque of the "Game of the Century" played between Italy and West Germany, as well as Diego Maradona's "Goal of the Century" against England.

There is also a commemorative plaque with the names of the first goal scorer in the inaugural match and in the first match played at night.

Notable events

FIFA World Cups

Estadio Azteca has hosted the FIFA World Cup on two occasions, hosting a total of nineteen FIFA World Cup matches overall. The stadium hosted ten matches during the 1970 FIFA World Cup including the final. Sixteen years later the stadium hosted nine matches during the 1986 FIFA World Cup, including the final which was the second FIFA World Cup final to be played at the stadium. Estadio Azteca will host matches during the 2026 FIFA World Cup which will make the stadium the only stadium to have hosted the FIFA World Cup on three occasions.

List of 1970 FIFA World Cup matches

List of 1986 FIFA World Cup matches

2026 FIFA World Cup
Mexico City was formally announced as a host city for the FIFA World Cup in June 2020 when FIFA announced the most cities for the tournament. Mexico City is one of three host cities in Mexico and is one of sixteen host cities overall for the tournament which is being staged across the United States, Canada and Mexico. In the lead-up to the 2026 FIFA World Cup, the stadium will undergo renovations.

Other Association football events
1968 Summer Olympics
1971 Women's World Cup
1975 Pan American Games
1977 CONCACAF Championship
1983 FIFA World Youth Championship
1985 Mexico City Cup / Azteca 2000
1993 CONCACAF Gold Cup
1999 FIFA Confederations Cup
2003 CONCACAF Gold Cup
2011 FIFA U-17 World Cup

Fan violence
On 25 April 2022, a fight involving association football fans and the police ensued after a Cruz Azul versus Atlético San Luis game. No arrests or injuries were reported. San Luis won the game, 1–0.

American football

On 15 August 1994, Estadio Azteca hosted a preseason American Bowl game between the Houston Oilers and Dallas Cowboys which still holds the record for the highest attendance at any NFL game, with 112,376 in attendance. The Houston Oilers won the game 6–0.
On 2 October 2005, the first international regular-season game in the history of the NFL was played in the stadium between the San Francisco 49ers and the Arizona Cardinals. The game was a 31–14 victory for the Cardinals. It set the record of the largest crowd to attend a regular-season NFL game with 103,467, but this record would be broken in 2009.
On 21 November 2016, the Oakland Raiders hosted a home game along with the Houston Texans as part of the NFL International Series in the first game dubbed NFL Mexico Game. It was the first Monday Night Football game played outside the United States. The game saw a sell-out crowd of 76,743 in a renovated Estadio Azteca.
On 19 November 2017, the Raiders hosted the Patriots at the stadium.
 The Kansas City Chiefs were scheduled to play the Los Angeles Rams at the stadium on 19 November 2018. However, due to poor field conditions brought on by recent events, as well as rain, the NFL cancelled the event and moved it to the Rams' home stadium Los Angeles Memorial Coliseum.
 The Kansas City Chiefs played the Los Angeles Chargers on 18 November 2019, with the Chargers designated as the "home" team.

Concerts
On 12 March 1983, Menudo was the first band to sell out a solo concert at the stadium with an attendance of over 100,000 people. 
On 29, 31 October and 7, 9 and 11 November 1993, Michael Jackson finished the Dangerous World Tour with five sold-out shows at this stadium, for a total of 500,000 people.
On 15 February 1997, Gloria Estefan performed at the stadium.
On 16 June 2000, Los Temerarios performed at the Estadio Azteca for the first time in their career, in a sold-out concert with the max of capacity, was over 100,000 people that attended. This concert was filmed in live.
Luis Miguel Mis romances tour 2002
Irish rock band U2 performed at the stadium on 15 and 16 February 2006 for their Vertigo Tour with 141,278 people attended the shows.
On 11, 14, 15 May 2011, Irish rock band U2 presented the 360° Tour scoring the most-attended concert on the tour with a total attendance of 282,978 people.
On 8 May 2012, Paul McCartney performed at the Estadio Azteca for the first time in his career, in a non-sold-out concert for 53,000 people.
On 16 April 2016, Vicente Fernández played his farewell concert, titled "UN AZTECA EN EL AZTECA, ADIÓS A UN GRANDE", to a sell out crowd at the stadium with an attendance of over 100,000 people.
On 11 and 12 October 2018, Shakira performed for around 200,000 fans (in both concerts combined) with her El Dorado World Tour.
On 9 and 10 December 2022, Bad Bunny performed for around 170,000 fans (in both concerts combined) with his World's Hottest Tour.

Christian events
Nigerian Pastor T.B. Joshua held a two-day Christian crusade, attracting an estimated 150,000 over both days.
From 13 to 14 December 2013, assemblies were held by the Jehovah's Witnesses to commemorate their religious devotion with a series of performances in scenes of biblical passages, social-contemporary themes and Christian baptisms, of which each day record of participation of 105,000 faithful, of which on Sunday there was the record time of eviction of 10 minutes for reasons of other scheduled events and in turn 2000 participants were dedicated to cleaning after each event.

Funeral services
A public funeral service for popular Mexican comedian Roberto Gomez "Chespirito" Bolaños was held at Azteca on 30 November 2014, and was attended by 40,000 spectators. Chespirito had been a long-time supporter of Club América.

See also
List of football stadiums in Mexico

References

Further reading
 "Magical memories live on in the vaunted Azteca" – fifaworldcup.com – FIFA

External links

 Official Site of the Estadio Azteca

Azteca
1970 FIFA World Cup stadiums
1986 FIFA World Cup stadiums
2026 FIFA World Cup Stadiums
1999 FIFA Confederations Cup stadiums
CONCACAF Gold Cup stadiums
Azteca
Club América
Mexico
American Bowl venues
Venues of the 1968 Summer Olympics
Olympic football venues
Pan American Games opening ceremony stadiums
National Football League venues
Sports venues completed in 1966
American football venues in Mexico
1966 establishments in Mexico
Tlalpan
Stadiums that have hosted a FIFA World Cup opening match